Sérgio Antônio Soler de Oliveira Júnior (born 15 March 1995), commonly known as Serginho, is a Brazilian footballer who currently plays for Changchun Yatai as an attacking midfielder or second-striker.

Club career
Born in Monte Aprazível, São Paulo, Serginho joined Santos FC's youth setup in 2011, aged 15, after being released by rivals São Paulo FC due to a recurrent back injury. He soon earned plaudits for his performances with the under-20's, being a key midfield unit during the 2014 Copa São Paulo de Futebol Júnior winning campaign.

On 9 March 2014 Serginho made his first-team debut, coming on as a late substitute in a 4–1 home success over Oeste for the Campeonato Paulista championship. He made his Série A debut on 11 September, again from the bench in a 1–3 away loss against Sport Recife.

On 15 January 2016, Serginho renewed his contract – which was due to expire at the end of the year – until 2018. On 7 July, he was loaned to fellow top tier club Vitória until the end of the year.

Serginho scored his first professional goal 17 November 2016, netting Vitória's second in a 2–3 away loss against former club Santos. The following 17 February he moved to Santo André, on loan until the end of the 2017 Campeonato Paulista.

Upon returning, Serginho did not play a single minute until July 2017, in a 1–0 away win against Atlético Mineiro. He started to feature more regularly in late September, mainly used as a substitute.

On 23 January 2018, Serginho was loaned to fellow top tier club América Mineiro for one year. On 15 April, he scored a brace in a 3–0 home defeat of Sport.

On 29 July 2018, he moved to J1 League club Kashima Antlers. Serginho made an impressive appearance with Kashima in the 2018 AFC Champions League.

Career statistics
.

Honours

Club
Santos
Campeonato Paulista: 2015, 2016
Copa São Paulo de Futebol Júnior: 2014
Kashima Antlers
AFC Champions League: 2018
Changchun Yatai
China League One: 2020

References

External links
Santos official profile 

1995 births
Living people
Footballers from São Paulo (state)
Brazilian footballers
Association football midfielders
Campeonato Brasileiro Série A players
Santos FC players
Esporte Clube Vitória players
Esporte Clube Santo André players
América Futebol Clube (MG) players
Kashima Antlers players
Changchun Yatai F.C. players
Chinese Super League players
China League One players
Brazilian expatriate footballers
Expatriate footballers in China
Brazilian expatriate sportspeople in China
People from Monte Aprazível